The Twenty-Sixth Canadian Ministry was the combined cabinet, chaired by Prime Minister Jean Chrétien, and the contemporary secretaries of state.  It governed Canada from 4 November 1993 to 12 December 2003, including the 35th Canadian Parliament, the 36th, and the first half of the 37th. The government was formed by the Liberal Party of Canada. One particular fact of this ministry is the creation of Secretaries of State out of the Cabinet, but still in the ministry.

Ministries and Cabinet members 
Prime Minister
4 November 1993 – 12 December 2003: Jean Chrétien
Deputy Prime Minister of Canada
4 November 1993 – 30 April 1996: Sheila Copps
1 May 1996 – 18 June 1996: Vacant
19 June 1996 – 10 June 1997: Sheila Copps
11 June 1997 – 14 January 2002: Herb Gray
15 January 2002 – 12 December 2003: John Manley
Minister of Agriculture
4 November 1993 – 11 January 1995: Ralph Goodale
Became Minister of Agriculture and Agri-Food.
Minister of Agriculture and Agri-Food
Was Minister of Agriculture.
12 January 1995 – 10 June 1997: Ralph Goodale
11 June 1997 – 12 December 2003: Lyle Vanclief
Minister for the Atlantic Canada Opportunities Agency
4 November 1993 – 24 January 1996: David Charles Dingwall
25 January 1996 – 16 October 2000: John Manley
17 October 2000 – 14 January 2002: Brian Tobin
15 January 2002 – 12 December 2003: Allan Rock
Minister of Canadian Heritage
Was Minister of Communications and Minister of Multiculturalism and Citizenship.
12 July 1996 – 12 December 2003: Sheila Copps
Minister of Citizenship and Immigration
30 June 1994 – 24 January 1996: Sergio Marchi
25 January 1996 – 2 August 1999: Lucienne Robillard
3 August 1999 – 14 January 2002: Elinor Caplan
15 January 2002 – 12 December 2003: Denis Coderre
Minister of Communications
4 November 1993 – 24 January 1996: Michel Dupuy
25 January 1996 – 30 April 1996: Sheila Copps
1 May 1996 – 18 June 1996: Vacant
19 June 1996 – 11 July 1996: Sheila Copps
Became Minister of Canadian Heritage
Minister of Consumer and Corporate Affairs
4 November 1993 – 28 March 1995: John Manley
Became Minister of Industry.
Minister of Employment and Immigration
4 November 1993 – 24 January 1996: Lloyd Axworthy
25 January 1996 – 11 July 1996: Douglas Young
Became Minister of Human Resources Development.
Minister of Energy, Mines and Resources
4 November 1993 – 11 January 1995: Anne McLellan
Became Minister of Natural Resources.
Minister of the Environment
4 November 1993 – 24 January 1996: Sheila Copps
25 January 1996 – 10 June 1997: Sergio Marchi
11 June 1997 – 2 August 1999: Christine Stewart
3 August 1999 – 12 December 2003: David Anderson
Minister of Finance
4 November 1993 – 2 June 2002: Paul Martin
2 June 2002 – 12 December 2003: John Manley
Minister of Fisheries and Oceans
4 November 1993 – 8 January 1996: Brian Tobin
25 January 1996 – 10 June 1997: Fred J. Mifflin
11 June 1997 – 2 August 1999: David Anderson
3 August 1999 – 14 January 2002: Herb Dhaliwal
15 January 2002 – 12 December 2003: Robert G. Thibault
Minister of Foreign Affairs
Was Secretary of State for External Affairs.
13 May 1995 – 24 January 1996 André Ouellet
25 January 1996 – 16 October 2000 Lloyd Axworthy
17 October 2000 – 15 January 2002 John Manley
16 January 2002 – 12 December 2003 Bill Graham
Minister of Forestry
4 November 1993 – 11 January 1995: Anne McLellan
Became Minister of Natural Resources.
Minister of Health
Was Minister of National Health and Welfare.
12 July 1996 – 10 June 1997: David Charles Dingwall
11 June 1997 – 14 January 2002: Allan Rock
15 January 2002 – 12 December 2003: Anne McLellan
Minister of Human Resources Development
Was Minister of Employment and Immigration.
12 July 1996 – 3 October 1996: Douglas Young
4 October 1996 – 2 August 1999: Pierre Pettigrew
3 August 1999 – 12 December 2003: Jane Stewart
Minister of Indian Affairs and Northern Development
4 November 1993 – 10 June 1997: Ron Irwin
11 June 1997 – 2 August 1999: Jane Stewart
3 August 1999 – 12 December 2003: Robert Daniel Nault
Minister of Industry
Was Minister of Consumer and Corporate Affairs and Minister of Industry, Science and Technology.
29 March 1995 – 16 October 2000: John Manley
17 October 2000 – 14 January 2002: Brian Tobin
15 January 2002 – 12 December 2003: Allan Rock
Minister of Industry, Science and Technology
4 November 1993 – 28 March 1995: John Manley
Became Minister of Industry.
Minister for International Cooperation
25 January 1996 – 3 October 1996: Pierre Pettigrew
4 October 1996 – 10 June 1997: Don Boudria
11 June 1997 – 2 August 1999: Diane Marleau
3 August 1999 – 14 January 2002: Maria Minna
15 January 2002 – 12 December 2003: Susan Whelan
Minister for International Trade
4 November 1993 – 24 January 1996: Roy MacLaren
25 January 1996 – 10 June 1997: Arthur C. Eggleton
11 June 1997 – 2 August 1999: Sergio Marchi
3 August 1999 – 12 December 2003: Pierre Pettigrew
Minister of Intergovernmental Affairs
4 November 1993 – 24 January 1996: Marcel Massé
25 January 1996 – 12 December 2003: Stéphane Dion
Minister of Justice
4 November 1993 – 10 June 1997: Allan Rock
11 June 1997 – 14 January 2002: Anne McLellan
15 January 2002 – 12 December 2003: Martin Cauchon
Attorney General of Canada
4 November 1993 – 12 December 2003: The Minister of Justice (Ex officio)
4 November 1993 – 10 June 1997: Allan Rock
11 June 1997 – 14 January 2002: Anne McLellan
15 January 2002 – 12 December 2003: Martin Cauchon
Minister of Labour
4 November 1993 – 21 February 1995: Lloyd Axworthy
22 February 1995 – 24 January 1996: Lucienne Robillard
25 January 1996 – 10 June 1997: Alfonso Gagliano
11 June 1997 – 22 November 1998: Lawrence MacAulay
23 November 1998 – 12 December 2003: Claudette Bradshaw
Minister of Multiculturalism and Citizenship
4 November 1993 – 24 January 1996: Michel Dupuy
25 January 1996 – 30 April 1996: Sheila Copps
1 May 1996 – 18 June 1996: Vacant
19 June 1996 – 11 July 1996: Sheila Copps
Became Minister of Canadian Heritage
Minister of National Defence
4 November 1993 – 4 October 1996: David Michael Collenette
4 October 1996 – 10 June 1997: Douglas Young
11 June 1997 – 26 May 2002: Arthur C. Eggleton
26 May 2002 – 12 December 2003: John McCallum
Minister of National Health and Welfare
4 November 1993 – 24 January 1996: Diane Marleau
25 January 1996 – 11 July 1996: David Charles Dingwall
Became Minister of Health.
Minister of National Revenue
4 November 1993 – 24 January 1996: David Anderson
25 January 1996 – 10 June 1997: Jane Stewart
11 June 1997 – 2 August 1999: Herb Dhaliwal
3 August 1999 – 14 January 2002: Martin Cauchon
15 January 2002 – 12 December 2003: Elinor Caplan
Minister of Natural Resources
Was Minister of Energy, Mines and Resources and Minister of Forestry.
12 January 1995 – 10 June 1997: Anne McLellan
11 June 1997 – 14 January 2002: Ralph Goodale
15 January 2002 – 12 December 2003: Herb Dhaliwal
Minister of Public Works
4 November 1993 – 24 January 1996: David Charles Dingwall
25 January 1996 – 11 July 1996: Diane Marleau
Became Minister of Public Works and Government Services.
Minister of Public Works and Government Services
Was Minister of Public Works and Minister of Supply and Services.
12 July 1996 – 10 June 1997: Diane Marleau
11 June 1997 – 14 January 2002: Alfonso Gagliano
15 January 2002 – 25 May 2002: Don Boudria
26 May 2002 – 12 December 2003: Ralph Goodale
Minister of Supply and Services
4 November 1993 – 24 January 1996: David Charles Dingwall
25 January 1996 – 11 July 1996: Diane Marleau
Became Minister of Public Works and Government Services.
Minister of Transport
4 November 1993 – 24 January 1996: Douglas Young
25 January 1996 – 10 June 1997: David Anderson
11 June 1997 – 12 December 2003: David Michael Collenette
Minister of Veterans Affairs
4 November 1993 – 4 October 1996: David Michael Collenette
4 October 1996 – 10 June 1997: Douglas Young
11 June 1997 – 2 August 1999: Fred J. Mifflin
3 August 1999 – 16 October 2000: George Baker
17 October 2000 – 14 January 2002: Ronald J. Duhamel
15 January 2002 – 12 December 2003: Rey Pagtakhan
Minister of Western Economic Diversification
4 November 1993 – 24 January 1996: Lloyd Axworthy
25 January 1996 – 16 October 2000: John Manley
17 October 2000 – 14 January 2002: Brian Tobin
15 January 2002 – 12 December 2003: Allan Rock
Leader of the Government in the House of Commons
4 November 1993 – 10 June 1997: Herb Gray
11 June 1997 – 14 January 2002: Don Boudria
15 January 2002 – 25 May 2002: Ralph Goodale
26 May 2002 – 12 December 2003: Don Boudria
Leader of the Government in the Senate
4 November 1993 – 10 June 1997: Joyce Fairbairn
11 June 1997 – 3 October 1999: Bernard Alasdair Graham
4 October 1999 – 8 January 2001: J. Bernard Boudreau
9 January 2001 – 12 December 2003: Sharon Carstairs
President of the Privy Council
4 November 1993 – 24 January 1996: Marcel Massé
25 January 1996 – 12 December 2003: Stéphane Dion
President of the Treasury Board
4 November 1993 – 24 January 1996: Arthur C. Eggleton
25 January 1996 – 2 August 1999: Marcel Massé
3 August 1999 – 12 December 2003: Lucienne Robillard
Secretary of State of Canada
4 November 1993 – 24 January 1996: Sergio Marchi
25 January 1996 – 12 July 1996: Lucienne Robillard
Secretary of State for External Affairs
4 November 1993 – 12 May 1995: André Ouellet
Became Minister of Foreign Affairs.
Solicitor General of Canada
4 November 1993 – 10 June 1997: Herb Gray
11 June 1997 – 23 November 1998: Andy Scott
23 November 1998 – 22 October 2002: Lawrence MacAulay
22 October 2002 – 12 December 2003: Arnold Wayne Easter
Minister of State (Atlantic Canada Opportunities Agency)
17 October 2000 – 8 January 2001: J. Bernard Boudreau
9 January 2001 – 15 January 2002: Robert G. Thibault
16 January 2002 – 12 December 2003: Gerry Byrne
Minister of State (Deputy Prime Minister)
11 June 1997 – 14 January 2002: Herb Gray
15 January 2002 – 1 June 2002: John Manley
 Minister of State (Leader of the Government at the House of Commons)
 11 June 1997 – 14 January 2002: Don Boudria
 15 January 2002 – 25 May 2002: Ralph Goodale
26 May 2002 – 12 December 2003: Don Boudria
Minister responsible for La Francophonie
25 January 1996 – 3 October 1996: Pierre Pettigrew
4 October 1996 – 10 June 1997: Don Boudria
Minister responsible for Infrastructure
4 November 1993 – 24 January 1996: Arthur C. Eggleton
25 January 1996 – 2 August 1999: Marcel Massé
Minister responsible for Public Service Renewal
4 November 1993 – 24 January 1996: Marcel Massé
Minister responsible for the Economic Development Agency of Canada for the Regions of Quebec
17 October 2000 – 14 January 2002: Brian Tobin
Minister responsible for the Federal Office of Regional Development - Quebec
4 November 1993 – 24 January 1996: Paul Martin
25 January 1996 – 10 June 1997: John Manley
Minister with political responsibility for Quebec
15 January 2002 – 12 December 2003: Martin Cauchon
Minister with special responsibility for Literacy
4 November 1993 – 10 June 1997: Joyce Fairbairn

Ministries not Cabinet members 
Secretary of State (Agriculture and Agri-Food)
18 June 1997 – 2 August 1999: Gilbert Normand
Secretary of State (Agriculture and Agri-Food, Fisheries and Oceans)
15 September 1994 – 10 June 1997: Fernand Robichaud
Secretary of State (Amateur Sport)
3 August 1999 – 14 January 2002: Denis Coderre
15 January 2002 – 17 June 2003: Paul DeVillers
Secretary of State (Asia Pacific)
4 November 1993 – 8 January 2001: Raymond Chan
9 January 2001 – 14 January 2002: Rey Pagtakhan
15 January 2002 – 12 December 2003: David Kilgour
Secretary of State (Atlantic Canada Opportunities Agency)
25 January 1996 – 10 June 1997: Lawrence MacAulay
11 June 1997 – 2 August 1999: Fred J. Mifflin
3 August 1999 – 16 October 2000: George Baker
Secretary of State (Central and Eastern Europe and Middle East)
15 January 2002 – 12 December 2003: Gar Knutson
Secretary of State (Children and Youth)
11 June 1997 – 12 December 2003: Ethel Blondin-Andrew
Secretary of State (Deputy Leader of the Government in the House of Commons)
15 September 1994 – 14 January 2002: Alfonso Gagliano
15 January 2002 – 12 December 2003: Paul DeVillers
Secretary of State (Economic Development Agency of Canada for the Regions of Quebec)
Was Secretary of State (Federal Office of Regional Development - Quebec).
23 February 1998 – 14 January 2002: Martin Cauchon
15 January 2002 – 12 December 2003: Claude Drouin
Secretary of State (Federal Economic Development Initiative for Northern Ontario)
3 August 1999 – 12 December 2003: Andrew Mitchell
Secretary of State (Federal Office of Regional Development - Quebec)
25 January 1996 – 22 February 1998: Martin Cauchon
Became Secretary of State (Economic Development Agency of Canada for the Regions of Quebec).
Secretary of State (Fisheries and Oceans)
18 June 1997 – 2 August 1999: Gilbert Normand
Secretary of State (Francophonie)
3 August 1999 – 14 January 2002: Ronald J. Duhamel
15 January 2002 – 12 December 2003: Denis Paradis
Secretary of State (Indian Affairs and Northern Development)
15 January 2002 – 12 December 2003: Stephen Owen
Secretary of State (International Financial Institutions)
4 November 1993 – 10 June 1997: Douglas Peters
11 June 1997 – 14 January 2002: James Scott Peterson
15 January 2002 – 25 May 2002: John McCallum
26 May 2002 – 12 December 2003: Maurizio Bevilacqua
Secretary of State (Latin America and Africa)
4 November 1993 – 10 June 1997: Christine Stewart
11 June 1997 – 14 January 2002: David Kilgour
15 January 2002 – 12 December 2003: Denis Paradis
Secretary of State (Multiculturalism)
4 November 1993 – 24 January 1996: Sheila Finestone
25 January 1996 – 27 January 2002: Hedy Fry
28 January 2002 – 25 May 2002: Claudette Bradshaw
26 May 2002 – 12 December 2003: Jean Augustine
Secretary of State (Parks)
11 June 1997 – 2 August 1999: Andrew Mitchell
Secretary of State (Parliamentary Affairs)
4 November 1993 – 14 September 1994: Fernand Robichaud
15 September 1994 – 24 January 1996: Alfonso Gagliano
Secretary of State (Physical Activity and Sport)
17 June 2003 – 12 December 2003: Paul DeVillers
Secretary of State (Rural Development)
3 August 1999 – 12 December 2003: Andrew Mitchell
Secretary of State (Science, Research and Development)
4 November 1993 – 10 June 1997: Jon Gerrard
11 June 1997 – 2 August 1999: Ronald J. Duhamel
3 August 1999 – 14 January 2002: Gilbert Normand
15 January 2002 – 25 May 2002: Maurizio Bevilacqua
26 May 2002 – 12 December 2003: Rey Pagtakhan
Secretary of State (Selected Crown Corporations)
11 April 2003 – 12 December 2003: Steven W. Mahoney
Secretary of State (Status of Women)
4 November 1993 – 24 January 1996: Sheila Finestone
25 January 1996 – 27 January 2002: Hedy Fry
28 January 2002 – 25 May 2002: Claudette Bradshaw
26 May 2002 – 12 December 2003: Jean Augustine
Secretary of State (Training and Youth)
4 November 1993 – 10 June 1997: Ethel Blondin-Andrew
Secretary of State (Veterans)
4 November 1993 – 10 June 1997: Lawrence MacAulay
Secretary of State (Western Economic Diversification)
25 January 1996 – 10 June 1997: Jon Gerrard
11 June 1997 – 14 January 2002: Ronald J. Duhamel
15 January 2002 – 12 December 2003: Stephen Owen

References

Succession 

26
Ministries of Elizabeth II
1993 establishments in Canada
2003 disestablishments in Canada
Cabinets established in 1993
Cabinets disestablished in 2003